White Savage is a 1943 American Technicolor South Seas adventure film directed by Arthur Lubin and starring Maria Montez, Jon Hall and Sabu. The film was re-released by Realart in 1948 on a double-feature with the same three stars in Cobra Woman (1944) and again in 1953, under the title White Savage Woman. It was choreographed by Lester Horton.

Plot
Montez is the ruler of the tropical Temple Island. Thomas Gomez plays the villain, who schemes to marry her and get hold of the gold bars lining the submerged floor of the island's temple (about which the innocent islanders remain blissfully unconcerned).  Jon Hall plays a heroic shark hunter who wins the day and the heart of the princess.

Cast

 Maria Montez as Princess Tahia
 Jon Hall as Kaloe
 Sabu as Orano
 Thomas Gomez as Sam Miller
 Sidney Toler as Wong 
 Paul Guilfoyle as Erik
 Turhan Bey as Tamara
 Don Terry as Chris
 Constance Purdy as Blossom
 Al Kikume as Guard
 Frederic Brunn as Sully
 Anthony Warde as Clerk

Production
White Savage had been the original title for Montez's first starring vehicle, South of Tahiti (1941).

Arabian Nights was so popular that Universal commissioned two follow-up movies to star Montez, Hall and Sabu – White Savage and Cobra Woman. Gene Lewis wrote the original script for White Savage.

Montez's costumes in some scenes were considered to be too skimpy, requiring those scenes to be cut.

Reception
Diabolique said "Not as well known as Montez's later camp classic Cobra Woman (1944) (to be fair, all her American films are camp classics), White Savage is actually a better movie – Montez and Hall seem to genuinely like each other (not always the case in their films), Richard Brooks’ script is clever and there's plenty of action and gorgeous photography."

References

External links 
 
 
 
Review of film at Variety

1943 films
Films directed by Arthur Lubin
Films set on islands
Universal Pictures films
1943 adventure films
Films scored by Frank Skinner
American adventure films
1940s English-language films
1940s American films